Alfonso Gutiérrez (born 17 November 1961) is a Spanish former professional racing cyclist. He rode in three editions of the Tour de France, one edition of the Giro d'Italia and seven editions of the Vuelta a España.

Major results

1983
 1st GP Pascuas
 1st Stage 3 Vuelta a Castilla y León
 1st Stage 5 Vuelta a Asturias
 1st Stage 2a Vuelta a Cantabria
 2nd Road race, National Road Championships
1984
 1st Clásica de Sabiñánigo
 Tour of Galicia
1st Stages 1 & 5
 Vuelta a La Rioja
1st Stages 2 & 3a
 1st Stage 2 Volta a Catalunya
 1st Stage 1 Vuelta a Aragón
 1st Stage 3 Setmana Catalana de Ciclisme
 1st Stage 2 Vuelta a Burgos
 1st Stage 2 Vuelta a los Valles Mineros
 2nd Circuito de Getxo
1985
 1st Stage 1 Volta a Catalunya
 1st Stage 3a Vuelta a La Rioja
 2nd Trofeo Masferrer
1986
 1st  Road race, National Road Championships
 1st  Overall Vuelta a Castilla y León
1st Stages 3, 4, 5 & 6
 1st Stage 4 Vuelta a España
 1st Stage 7a Paris–Nice
 Vuelta a Burgos
1st  Points classification
1st Stages 1, 2a, 3 & 5
 Vuelta a Cantabria
1st Stages 1 & 4
 6th Road race, UCI Road World Championships
1987
 1st  Overall Vuelta a Castilla y León
1st Stages 4, 7 & 9
 Vuelta a España
1st  Points classification
1st Stage 4
 Vuelta a Cantabria
1st Stages 2 & 5b
 1st Stage 6 Vuelta a Andalucía
 1st Stage 2 Vuelta a La Rioja
 2nd Road race, National Road Championships
1988
 1st Clásica de Sabiñánigo
 Volta a Catalunya
1st  Points classification
1st Stage 2
 1st Stage 3 Vuelta a Andalucía
 1st Stage 5 Vuelta a Burgos
1989
 Troféu Joaquim Agostinho
1st Stages 2 & 4
 1st Stage 2 Vuelta a Castilla y León
1990
 1st  Overall Vuelta a La Rioja
1st Stage 4
 Tour of Galicia
1st Stages 1 & 5
 2nd Circuito de Getxo
 6th Trofeo Masferrer
1991
 Vuelta a Asturias
1st Stages 3 & 5
 1st Stage 4 Volta a Catalunya
 1st Stage 2 Setmana Catalana de Ciclisme
 1st Stage 2 Tour of Galicia
 3rd Overall Vuelta a Castilla y León
1992
 Vuelta a Mallorca
1st Stages 3 & 4
 1st Stage 2 Vuelta a Asturias
 2nd Clásica de Almería
 7th Circuito de Getxo
1993
 1st  Overall Vuelta a Aragón
 1st Stage 2 Vuelta a España
 1st Stage 1 Volta a la Comunitat Valenciana
 1st Stage 3 Vuelta a Murcia
 1st Stage 3 Vuelta a Castilla y León
 1st Stage 3 Vuelta a Burgos
 2nd Trofeo Masferrer
 3rd Trofeo Luis Puig
1994
 Vuelta a Mallorca
1st Stages 3a & 5
 5th Clásica de Almería

Grand Tour general classification results timeline

References

External links
 

1961 births
Living people
Spanish male cyclists
People from Torrelavega
Cyclists from Cantabria